Veprecula bandensis is a species of sea snail, a marine gastropod mollusk in the family Raphitomidae.

Description
The length of the shell attains 21 mm.

Distribution
This marine species occurs off Eastern Indonesia.

References

External links
 Sysoev, A., 1997. Mollusca Gastropoda: New deep-water turrid gastropods (Conoidea) from eastern Indonesia. Mémoires du Muséum national d'Histoire naturelle 172: 325-355
 MNHN, Paris : holotype
 

bandensis
Gastropods described in 1997